Karam Alhamad (Arabic: كرم الحمد; born 1990) is a Syrian journalist and human rights activist, and former  political detainee. Alhamad is also known for his efforts to cover the Syrian uprising, including being jailed four times between 2011 and 2014.

Early life and education
Alhamad was born in Deir al-Zour, Syria in 1990. As a child, he was awarded a camera and Internet access for his success in school by the First Lady of Syria, Asma al-Assad.

Alhamad studied petroleum engineering at Al-Furat University, but was unable to finish his degree due to his multiple arrests. In 2015, he participated in the Leaders of Democracy Fellowship at Syracuse University's Maxwell School of Citizenship and Public Affairs. Alhamad interned at Amnesty International as part of the fellowship. He eventually graduated with a degree in Economics, Politics, and Social Thought from Bard College Berlin in 2020. He is scheduled to begin attending Yale University on a scholarship in 2021, studying for an MPP in Global Affairs.

Political activism
During his first year at Al-Furat University, Alhamad published a magazine on campus containing hidden messages speaking out against the Assad regime. Alhamad was arrested for the first time in July 2011 for participating in anti-regime demonstrations. He was arrested a second time and jailed for 70 days after he was accused of leading demonstrations.

By 2013, Alhamad was also running Deir al-Zour's media center, an activist organization that helped document the events of the Syrian civil war.

Between his third and fourth arrests, Alhamad befriended American aid worker Peter Kassig, who was later killed by ISIS.

After organizing protests in Deir al-Zour, Alhamad was arrested for the fourth time in 2013. He was accused of spying, detained, and tortured in the Far' Falastin prison after a coerced confession. He was released in July 2014, after which he left the country, seeking refuge in Turkey.

Alhamad has served as a member of Deir al-Zour's local council.

In 2015, Alhamad was nominated for membership in the Youth Advisory Board for the United Nations Human Settlements Programme, or UN-Habitat.

Career
Alhamad's involvement in journalism began when he was still living in Syria. Before the protests, he had worked for the main newspaper in Deir al-Zour. During the protests, Alhamad worked with Reuters to publish photos of political demonstrations and the effects of the Assad regime's actions.

After his experiences under the Assad regime, Alhamad began writing articles about the situation in Syria for outlets such as Foreign Affairs, The Washington Post, The Huffington Post, The New Humanitarian, and Al Bawaba. His articles have also been published in scholarly journals such as the Yale Journal of International Affairs and International Studies Quarterly. Alhamad has also been quoted as an eyewitness to the Syrian uprising in news outlets such as Al Arabiya and the Associated Press.

Alhamad has also worked as a lead researcher on Eastern Syria, and his research projects have been supported by organizations such as USAID and Harvard University. He has worked with officials in the U.S. Embassy as a research coordinator for Eastern Syria-related topics.

See also
Human rights in Syria

References

Living people
1990 births
Syrian journalists
Syrian human rights activists
People from Deir ez-Zor
Bard College alumni